Kenoza Lake is a hamlet in Sullivan County, New York, United States. Kenoza Lake has a post office with ZIP code 12750, which opened on March 10, 1851.

References

Hamlets in Sullivan County, New York
Hamlets in New York (state)